Trent Joseph Giambrone (born December 20, 1993) is an American professional baseball infielder who is a free agent. He made his MLB debut in 2021 for the Chicago Cubs.

Amateur career
Giambrone attended Grace King High School in Metairie, Louisiana. He was drafted out of high school by the Los Angeles Dodgers in the 30th round of the 2012 MLB draft, but did not sign and instead attended Jones County Junior College in Ellisville, Mississippi to play college baseball for two seasons. He won the MACJC State Championship game with Jones County in 2014.  Giambrone then transferred to Delta State University where he played two seasons for the Statesmen. He hit .386/.433/.601/1.034 with 9 home runs and 52 RBI during his senior season in 2016. Giambrone was drafted by the Chicago Cubs in the 25th round of the 2016 MLB draft and signed with them for a $1,000 signing bonus.

Professional career
Giambrone spent his professional debut season of 2016 with the Eugene Emeralds, hitting .292/.404/.433/.837 with 4 home runs and 22 RBI. He spent the 2017 season with the Myrtle Beach Pelicans, hitting .242/.297/.348/.644 with 12 home runs and 44 RBI. Giambrone spent the 2018 season with the Tennessee Smokies, hitting .251/.333/.440/.772 with 17 home runs and 49 RBI. Following the 2018 season, he played in the Arizona Fall League for the Mesa Solar Sox. Giambrone spent the 2019 season with the Iowa Cubs, hitting .241/.314/.464/.779 with 23 home runs and 66 RBI. He did not play in 2020 due to the cancellation of the Minor League Baseball season because of the COVID-19 pandemic. Assigned back to Iowa for the 2021 minor league season, he hit .174/.274/.255/.529 with 3 home runs and 16 RBI. 

On September 29, 2021, Chicago selected his contract to the active roster and he made his MLB debut that day. Giambrone went 2-for-13 in 5 games with the Cubs. He was outrighted off of the 40-man roster on November 5. He elected free agency on November 10, 2022.

References

External links

Delta State Statesmen bio

1993 births
Living people
People from Metairie, Louisiana
Baseball players from Louisiana
Major League Baseball infielders
Chicago Cubs players
Jones County Bobcats baseball players
Delta State Statesmen baseball players
Eugene Emeralds players
Myrtle Beach Pelicans players
Tennessee Smokies players
Mesa Solar Sox players
Criollos de Caguas players
Iowa Cubs players